Alpout (also, Alpaut and Alpouç) is a village and municipality in the Goychay Rayon of Azerbaijan.  It has a population of 2,065.

References 

Populated places in Goychay District